Forbach is a commune in the Moselle department in Lorraine in northeastern France.

Forbach may also refer to:

 Gare de Forbach, railway station of Forbach
 US Forbach, football club of Forbach
 Canton of Forbach
 Arrondissement of Forbach, former arrondissement
 Battle of Spicheren, also known as Battle of Forbach, on 6 August 1870 during the Franco-Prussian War

 Forbach (Baden), a town in south-western Germany
 Forbach (Usa), a river in Hesse, Germany, tributary of the Usa
 Forbach Granite, a type of rock

 Wilhelm of the Palatinate-Zweibrücken, also known as Philipp Wilhelm Graf von Forbach (1754–1807), officer of the French and later general of the Bavarian Army